The 1937 Masaryk Grand Prix was a 750 kg Formula race held on 26 September 1937 at the Masaryk Circuit.

Race report
Rudolf Hasse and Achille Varzi did not race due to illness. Rosemeyer took the Auto Union into an early lead and von Brauchitsch couldn't match his skill on the gravel surface as he pulled away from the field. On lap five Lang lost control of his Mercedes and left the road and ploughed into some bystanders, killing two and injuring twelve. Unable to catch Rosemeyer von Brauchitsch let Caracciola past and the latter began catching the young Auto Union driver. In the end though it was unnecessary to pass him, Rosemeyer's brakes gave out and his race was over...or maybe not.

Müller had been in second place, but couldn't keep the Mercedes' behind and both Seaman and von Brauchitsch caught and passed him and he dropped to fourth. Back in the pits Rosemeyer took over Müller's car and immediately set about catching the now cruising Mercedes' drivers. Seaman was 48s ahead at the beginning of the final 29 km lap, Rosemeyer finished the lap 37s ahead of him! Von Brauchitsch was only another 5s ahead when they took the flag and Rosemeyer had an incredible 3rd place whilst Caracciola had the win.

Classification

Grand Prix race reports
Masaryk
Masaryk